John Mayer (28 October 1930 – 9 March 2004) was an Indian composer known primarily for his fusions of jazz with Indian music in the British-based group Indo-Jazz Fusions with the Jamaican-born saxophonist Joe Harriott.

Mayer was born in Calcutta, Bengal, British India, to an Anglo-Indian father and Tamil mother. After studying with Phillipe Sandre in Calcutta and Melhi Mehta in Bombay, he won a scholarship to London's Royal Academy of Music in 1952, where he studied composition with Matyas Seiber, as well as comparative music and religion in eastern and western cultures.

He worked as a violinist with the London Philharmonic Orchestra (1953–58) and then with the Royal Philharmonic Orchestra (1958–65), but was also composing fusions of Hindustani classical and Western classical forms fused with jazz undertones from 1952 onwards. His Violin Sonata was performed by Yehudi Menuhin in 1955.

In the 1960s he worked extensively with the Jamaican-born jazz musician Joe Harriott, with whom he formed the group Indo-Jazz Fusions, a ten-piece featuring a jazz quintet and five Indian musicians. The new incarnation of the band, called John Mayer's Indo Jazz Fusions, was revived in the 1990s by his students Richard Dray, Will Joss, and Simon Gray, then led by Mayer himself, and continued to play live gigs—featuring his son Jonathan Mayer on sitar—until John's death.

His film scores included the music to Herostratus (1967) and Danger Route (1967). The Joe Harriott-John Mayer Double Quintet composed the distinctive theme tune, "Acka Raga", for the early episodes of the BBC quiz show Ask the Family, which was broadcast between 1967 and 1984. The theme featured Mayer on sitar.

From 1989 onwards, Mayer, who lived in north London, taught composition at Birmingham Conservatoire where he introduced the BMus Indian music course in 1997.
In March 2004, Mayer was hit by a car in North London and fatally injured. He was 74.

External links
John Mayer page
Guardian obituary
John Mayer | All Music
JohnMayerComposer.co.uk

1930 births
2004 deaths
Alumni of the Royal Academy of Music
Anglo-Indian people
Indian composers of Western classical music
Indian violinists
Musicians from Kolkata
Road incident deaths in London
20th-century violinists
20th-century Indian composers
Indian jazz musicians
FMR Records artists

ja:ジョン・メイヤー